Mussidia physostigmatis is a species of snout moth in the genus Mussidia. It was described by Ragonot in 1893, and is known from Nigeria.

References

Moths described in 1893
Phycitinae
Taxa named by Émile Louis Ragonot